The Old Thatch Tavern is a pub in Stratford-upon-Avon, England, located in the town centre on the corner of Rother Street and Greenhill Street.

History 

The Old Thatch Tavern became the brewery for Stratford-upon-Avon in 1470 when it was also a pub. It has been a licensed pub since 1623 and it is claimed that it is the oldest pub in Stratford.

The thatched building in which the pub is located has a Grade II listing and is the only thatched-roof property in Stratford's town centre.

See also 
 List of pubs in the United Kingdom

Notes and references

Notes

References 

Grade II listed pubs in Warwickshire
Buildings and structures in Stratford-upon-Avon
Thatched buildings in England
Timber framed buildings in Warwickshire
Timber framed pubs in England
1623 establishments in England
Pubs in Warwickshire